Buddleja scordioides is endemic to central Arizona, southeastern New Mexico, southwestern Texas, and the Chihuahua Desert of Mexico, growing amidst xeric thorn-scrub on alkaline soils at elevations of 600 – 2,500 m. The species was first named and described by Kunth in 1818.

Description
Buddleja scordioides is a weedy dioecious shrub 0.3 – 1.2 m tall with shredding bark. The young branches are subquadrangular and tomentose, bearing small oblong to linear membranaceous grayish-green leaves 1 – 3 cm long by 0.3 – 0.8 cm wide, rugose above, and tomentose on both surfaces. The sage - scented lemon - yellow leafy inflorescences are 2 – 10 cm long, comprising 3 – 15 pairs of sessile clusters, each with 15 – 20 flowers, the corollas 1.5 – 2 mm long. Ploidy: 2n = 38.

Cultivation
The species is not known to be in cultivation.

References

scordioides
Flora of Arizona
Flora of New Mexico
Flora of Texas
Endemic flora of the United States
Endemic flora of Mexico
Flora of the United States
Dioecious plants
Flora without expected TNC conservation status